is a Japanese columnist and essayist who has written extensively in Sunday Mainichi magazine. She is a graduate of Waseda University.

References

1946 births
Living people
Japanese essayists
People from Saitama (city)
Japanese women essayists
Japanese columnists
Japanese women columnists